Steve Albert (born Stephen Aufrichtig in Brooklyn, New York; April 26, 1952) is a former American sportscaster. He has served as a play-by-play announcer for the New Jersey Nets, New Orleans Hornets, Golden State Warriors, New York Mets, and Phoenix Suns as well as the Major Indoor Soccer League's New York Arrows. Albert ended his career as the television play-by-play announcer for the Phoenix Suns. He retired following the Suns' 2016-2017 season.

He also served as a broadcaster for the New York Islanders, New York Rangers, Cleveland Crusaders and New York Jets, and as the sports anchor at WCBS-TV, WNBC-TV and WWOR-TV and did morning sports reports on WABC (AM). He covered major boxing fights on Showtime Championship Boxing for 17 years, including the infamous "Bite Fight" between Mike Tyson and Evander Holyfield in 1997.  He was inducted in the International Boxing Hall of Fame 
as a member of the Class of 2018.

Steve was the play-by-play announcer for the "MTV Rock N' Jock" celebrity sports specials, partnered with comedian & game show host, Ken Ober, during the 1990s.

He has also been a co-host on the short-lived syndicated game show The Grudge Match alongside future Minnesota governor Jesse Ventura. He was also the play-by-play announcer for Battle Dome.

Personal life
Albert is the younger brother of broadcasters Marv Albert and Al Albert.

References

Year of birth missing (living people)
Living people
American game show hosts
American radio sports announcers
American television sports announcers
Boxing commentators
Golden State Warriors announcers
Jewish American sportspeople
Major League Baseball broadcasters
National Basketball Association broadcasters
National Football League announcers
National Hockey League broadcasters
New Jersey Nets announcers
New Orleans Hornets announcers
New York Islanders announcers
New York Jets announcers
New York Mets announcers
New York Rangers announcers
People from Brooklyn
Phoenix Suns announcers
International Boxing Hall of Fame inductees
Sportswriters from New York (state)
Cleveland Barons broadcasters
World Hockey Association broadcasters
21st-century American Jews